Stephen Michael Erickson is an American novelist. The author of acclaimed and influential works such as Days Between Stations, Tours of the Black Clock, Zeroville and Shadowbahn, he is the recipient of the American Academy of Arts and Letters award, the Lannan Lifetime Achievement Award and a Guggenheim fellowship.

Biography
Steve Erickson was born and raised in Los Angeles. For many years his mother, a former actress, ran a small theatre in L.A. His father, who died in 1990, was a photographer. Erickson had a pronounced stutter as a child when teachers believed he couldn't read; this motif occasionally has recurred in novels such as Amnesiascope. At UCLA Erickson studied literature, film, journalism and political philosophy, and for a few years he worked as a freelance writer for alternative weekly newspapers. Along with three works of non-fiction, Erickson has published 10 novels in more than a dozen languages. His books have appeared on best-of-the-year lists by the New York Times, the Los Angeles Times and the Washington Post.

A "writer's writer," Erickson is regarded as one of America's best living novelists, "a maximal visionary...in the league of [Thomas] Pynchon, [Don] DeLillo, [Margaret] Atwood, [Salman] Rushdie, [Ben] Okri, [Orhan] Pamuk." His work has been cited by Pynchon, David Foster Wallace, Richard Powers, Dana Spiotta, Neil Gaiman, William Gibson, Kathy Acker, Rick Moody, Joshua Cohen and Mark Z. Danielewski. Greil Marcus has called Erickson "the only authentic American surrealist," and Tours of the Black Clock appears on Larry McCaffery's list of the 20th Century’s Greatest Hits: 100 English-Language Books of Fiction. In a winter 2008 poll by the National Book Critics Circle of 800 novelists and writers, Zeroville was named one of the five favorite novels of the previous year, and in the December 2015 issue of Granta, Jonathan Lethem declared the then unreleased Shadowbahn (his most critically esteemed work) the best American novel of whatever year in which it was ultimately published. 

In 2021, the University Press of Mississippi issued Conversations With Steve Erickson as part of a series that includes William Faulkner, F. Scott Fitzgerald, Ernest Hemingway, James Baldwin, William S. Burroughs and Toni Morrison, proclaiming Erickson "a subterranean literary figure...[whose] dream-fueled blend of European modernism, American pulp and paranoid late-century postmodernism makes him essential to an appreciation of the last 40 years of American fiction." 

BBC Radio 4 broadcast an adaptation of Shadowbahn as part of its Dangerous Visions series in 2018, and a motion picture of Zeroville starring James Franco, Seth Rogen and Jacki Weaver was released in 2019. Twice a finalist for the National Magazine Award, Erickson has written for Esquire, Smithsonian, Rolling Stone, the New York Times Magazine and Los Angeles magazine among others, and is a member of the National Society of Film Critics. For 14 years he was founding editor of the literary journal Black Clock. Erickson is a Distinguished Professor at the University of California, Riverside, and appears briefly as a fictional character in Michael Ventura's 1996 novel The Death of Frank Sinatra.

Bibliography

Novels 
 Days Between Stations (1985)
 Rubicon Beach (1986)
 Tours of the Black Clock (1989)
 Arc d'X (1993)
 Amnesiascope (1996)
 The Sea Came in at Midnight (1999)
 Our Ecstatic Days (2005)
 Zeroville (2007)
 These Dreams of You (2012)
 Shadowbahn (2017)

Other 
 Leap Year (1989)
 American Nomad (1997)
 American Stutter (2022)

Honors and Awards 
 National Endowment for the Arts (1987);
 Notable Book of the Year, New York Times Book Review (1987): Rubicon Beach;
 Notable Book of the Year, New York Times Book Review (1989): Tours of the Black Clock;
 Best Books of the Year, Village Voice (1989): Tours of the Black Clock;
 Notable Book of the Year, New York Times Book Review (1993): Arc d'X;
 Best Fiction of the Year, Entertainment Weekly (1993): Arc d'X;
 Best Novel nominee, British Fantasy Society (1997): Amnesiascope;
 Notable Book of the Year, New York Times Book Review (1999): The Sea Came in at Midnight;
 Best Books of the Year, Uncut (1999): The Sea Came in at Midnight;
 Best Novel nominee, British Fantasy Society (1999): The Sea Came in at Midnight;
 2001 MacDowell Fellow;
 2002 MacDowell Fellow;
 Best Books of the Year, Los Angeles Times Book Review (2005): Our Ecstatic Days;
 Best Books of the Year, Uncut (2005): Our Ecstatic Days;
 John Simon Guggenheim Foundation Fellowship (2007);
 Best Books of the Year, Newsweek (2007): Zeroville;
 Best Books of the Year, Washington Post BookWorld (2007): Zeroville;
 Best Books of the Year, Los Angeles Times Book Review (2007): Zeroville;
 American Academy of Arts and Letters, Award in Literature (2010);
 Best Books of the Year, Los Angeles Times (2012): These Dreams of You;
 Lannan Lifetime Achievement Award (2014);
 Best Books of the Year, Los Angeles Times (2017): Shadowbahn;
 Best Books of the Year, Bookworm, KCRW (2017): Shadowbahn

References

External links 
 Official Site
 LA Weekly profile by Michael Ventura (1986)
 MostlyFiction interview (2007)
 New York Times review of Zeroville
 LitReactor Interview (2012)
 National Public Radio review of These Dreams of You
 Los Angeles Review of Books review of These Dreams of You
 New York Times review of Shadowbahn
 The Rumpus review of Shadowbahn
 The Rumpus interview by Rick Moody (2017)
 Here's the Thing interview by Alec Baldwin (2017)
 BBC4 adaptation of Shadowbahn (2018)
 The Believer interview with Steve Erickson (2019)

1950 births
20th-century American novelists
21st-century American novelists
American male novelists
Living people
Writers from California
American male essayists
20th-century American essayists
21st-century American essayists
20th-century American male writers
21st-century American male writers